Marie Christensen may refer to:

 Karen Marie Christensen (1871–1945), Danish trade unionist
 Kirsten Marie Christensen (1860–1935), Danish politician